Endotricha nigromaculata is a species of snout moth in the genus Endotricha with the generic name of "Endotricha". It was described by Paul E. S. Whalley in 1963, and is known from India.

References

Moths described in 1963
Endotrichini